Noto: An Unexplored Corner of Japan is a travel book written by the American businessman, mathematician and astronomer Percival Lowell, first published in 1891. It is dedicated to the British academic and Japanologist Basil Hall Chamberlain.

Lowell lived in Japan periodically from 1883-1893, and this book is one of three that Lowell wrote about Japan, the others being The Soul of The Far East (1888) and Occult Japan, or the Way of the Gods (1894).

Itinerary 
The book describes Lowell's 1886 journey from his then home in Tokyo, to the Noto Peninsula in Ishikawa Prefecture, on the western coast of the Sea of Japan. Lowell travelled westwards by train via Nagano to Naoetsu, and then via jinrikisha (rickshaw) to the town of Anamizu. Throughout the journey Lowell was accompanied by his Japanese manservant Yejiro.

In the first chapter Lowell recounts his motivation for the trip as follows:

"Scanning, one evening, in Tokyo, the map of Japan, in a vague, itinerary way, with the look one first gives to the crowd of faces in a ballroom, my eye was caught by the pose of a province that stood out in graphic mystery from the western coast. It made a striking figure there, with its deep-bosomed bays and its bold headlands. Its name, it appeared, was Noto."

In 2002 physicist and amateur astronomer Masatsugu Minami retraced and documented part of Lowell's route.

Recognition 

The town of Anamizu commemorates Lowell's visit to Noto with two memorials, one (erected 1981) located opposite Anamizu station, and the second (erected 2000) at the Manai River pier. The town operates a free Sunday bus called "ローエル" ("Lowell" written in katakana)  which takes visitors around the town.

Copyright status and publication 
The book was originally published by Houghton, Mifflin and Company in 1891. The text is out of copyright and editions have been internationally commercially republished many times. It is available on Google Books and Project Gutenberg.

References 

Asian travel books
1891 non-fiction books
Books about Japan
Houghton Mifflin books